KQIB (102.9 FM) is a radio station broadcasting a hot adult contemporary format. KQIB is licensed to Idabel, Oklahoma, United States. The station is currently owned by JDC Radio, Inc.

References

External links
KQIB official website

QIB
Hot adult contemporary radio stations in the United States